The broadcasts of Summer and Winter Olympic Games produced by Seven Sport is televised on the Seven Network in Australia.

Seven first broadcast the Olympics in 1956, jointly with the Nine Network and the ABC. It has since broadcast Olympic games intermittently, either jointly with other broadcasters or solely.

History

Early history
The Seven Network was a joint broadcaster for the 1956 Summer Olympics held in Melbourne, which was the first Olympics telecast in Australia, which it shared with the ABC and Nine television stations in Melbourne and Sydney.

The same trio of broadcasters telecast the 1976 Summer Olympics, before Seven gained exclusivity for the 1980 Summer Olympics. It lost the rights for the next two Games before regaining rights from 1992. With rising costs associated with purchasing broadcasting rights, Seven shared the telecast with SBS for the 2004 and 2008 Games.

Recent years
Seven held Australian free-to-air, pay television, online, and mobile telephony broadcast rights to the 2008 Summer Olympics in Beijing, on-selling some events to SBS. The live telecast of the Games of the XXIX Olympiad was shared by both the Seven Network and SBS Television. Seven broadcast the opening and closing ceremonies and mainstream sports, including swimming, athletics, rowing, cycling, and gymnastics. In contrast, SBS TV provided complementary coverage focused on long-form events such as football, road cycling, volleyball, and table tennis.

Seven lost its Olympics rights for the 2010 Winter Olympics and the 2012 Summer Olympics to a joint bid by the Nine Network and Foxtel. Rights to just the 2014 Winter Olympics were acquired by Network Ten.

On 5 August 2014, it was announced that Seven had acquired rights to the Olympics in Australia across all platforms for an undisclosed amount, in a deal lasting from 2016 through 2020, and also including the 2014 Summer Youth Olympics. IOC president Thomas Bach praised the deal, stating that the Committee "enjoys long term partnerships and this agreement is something of a homecoming between us and Seven." Seven West Media CEO Tim Worner explained that unlike previous stints as rightsholder, it would not necessarily have to sub-license the Games to a secondary broadcaster (as it had historically done with the ABC), stating that "[with] around 150 hours of content on any given day, there will be many more opportunities than ever before". However, Worner did not rule out the possibility of doing so.

For the 2016 Summer Olympics, coverage was offered across Seven, 7Two and 7mate. In order to allow Games to be broadcast in high definition in all capital cities, 7HD was temporarily changed to a simulcast of Seven's primary channel in Sydney, Brisbane and Perth for the duration of the Games. The Games were also streamed through a freemium mobile app; full access to Games content (including coverage of all events on live and on-demand basis) required purchase of a "premium" service costing $19.99. This content was also available free to Telstra mobile subscribers. Free content was limited to 900 hours of live content simulcast from the three Seven Network channels, and 300 hours of live digital-only content. Highlights of events were broadcast in the afternoon, while primetime program In Rio Today broadcast key moments, interviews and background information each night. Regularly scheduled programs Sunrise, Seven News at 6pm and The Chase Australia aired throughout, while other programming were taken off air for the duration of the Games on Seven.

Seven offered 2018 Winter Olympics coverage across Seven, 7Two and 7mate as well as its "OlympicsOn7" app, which similarly  to its 2016 Olympics service, offered a mix of free or paid coverage. 245 hours of broadcast Olympic content are expected. Seven will continue broadcasting scheduled programs Sunrise, The Chase Australia, Seven News at 6pm, Home & Away and My Kitchen Rules, with Olympic coverage airing at other times on its main channel. Hamish McLachlan, Edwina Bartholomew, Mel McLaughlin and Jason Richardson will be primary anchors based in PyeongChang. Three Olympic-themed The Front Bar specials will air during coverage.

Seven lost the rights to the 2024 Summer Olympics, the 2026 Winter Olympics, the 2028 Summer Olympics, the 2030 Winter Olympics and the 2032 Summer Olympics to rivals Nine Network.

Awards and honors
During its time as the broadcaster of the Olympic Games, it has won the Olympic Golden Rings for the Best Television coverage for the best television programme during the 2004 Olympic Games in Athens.

During the 2006 Olympics in Turin, Seven and NBC Universal were the major recipients of the Golden Rings; with Seven taking the Golden Rings for the best Olympic Programme, the Silver Rings for the best Olympic feature (NBC Universal received the Golden Rings), and the Bronze Rings for the Best Sports Coverage (behind SRG Switzerland and YLE Finland).

Criticism
Seven's coverage of the 2008 Summer Olympics was widely criticized by many viewers, who were angry at the networks contractual obligation to show AFL football over the Olympics. Viewers also complained that many team sports were delayed, with the absence of Roy and HG further angering viewers.

Seven's use of a paid service for full access to 2016 Summer Olympics content was criticized for contradicting and being a loophole around anti-siphoning laws (which require that specific sporting events, such as the Olympics, must have their rights primarily held by a terrestrial broadcaster), which account for premium television platforms such as Foxtel but not for over-the-top internet services. The arrangement was criticized by Tony Shepherd, chairman of the Australian Subscription Television and Radio Association (ASTRA), for serving as evidence that the existing anti-siphoning rules were outdated. Although considering the model to be "legal and understandable", Shepherd stated that Seven's "paywall" was "precisely the outcome the anti-siphoning scheme is meant to guard against."

Ratings

Due in large part to their coverage of the 2000 Summer Olympics in Sydney, Australia, the Seven Network won the ratings year for the first time in almost 20 years, just missing out on a clean sweep across the country - something that was rectified in 2007. The opening ceremony was one of the highest-ever rating television programmes in the country, with 6.5 million viewers.

Broadcast rights history

See also
Olympics on Australian television
Network Ten Olympic broadcasts
Nine Network Olympic broadcasts
Australia at the Olympics

References

1992 Australian television series debuts
2008 Australian television series endings
2016 Australian television series debuts
Seven
Seven Sport
Seven Network original programming
Seven